Scotophaeus blackwalli, also known as the mouse spider, is a species of spider belonging to the family Gnaphosidae.

Description
The adult males of these spiders reach 9mm in length, maturing in the early summer, while females reach 12mm, and can be found until autumn.

The carapace is dark brown while the abdomen is brown/grey with hairs resembling the body of a mouse, hence the common name of 'mouse spider'. The legs are brown with thick pubescence. The male has a small scutum on the dorsum of the abdomen.

Distribution and habitat
Scotophaeus blackwalli is native to Europe, the Caucasus, Turkey and Iran. It has been introduced to North America, Peru, and Hawaii. It is commonly found around and inside houses in Britain, usually in the Autumn, and also under bark and in holes in walls in warmer parts of Europe. It hunts nocturnally.

Subspecies
 Scotophaeus blackwalli isabellinus (Simon, 1873) — Corsica, Italy, Croatia
 Scotophaeus blackwalli politus (Simon, 1878) — France

References

External links
Scotophaeus blackwalli, Spider and Harvestman Recording Scheme

Gnaphosidae
Spiders of Europe
Spiders of Western Asia
Spiders described in 1871